Denis Eduardovich Vambolt (born 24 March 1995) is a Russian football goalkeeper. He plays for FC Shinnik Yaroslavl.

Club career
He made his debut in the Russian Football National League for FC Baltika Kaliningrad on 20 March 2016 in a game against FC Sibir Novosibirsk.

Career statistics

Club

References

External links
 Profile by Russian Football National League
 

1995 births
People from Baltiysk
Sportspeople from Kaliningrad Oblast
Living people
Russian footballers
Association football goalkeepers
FC Baltika Kaliningrad players
FC Amkar Perm players
FC Luch Vladivostok players
FC Tyumen players
FC Dynamo Bryansk players
FC Shinnik Yaroslavl players
Russian First League players
Russian Second League players